This is a list of lighthouses in Norfolk Island.

Lighthouses

See also
 Lists of lighthouses and lightvessels

References

External links
 

Norfolk Island
Buildings and structures in Norfolk Island